C'mon Miracle is Mirah's third full-length solo album. Produced by Phil Elvrum, the indie rock album was released on K Records on May 4, 2004.

Production
When Mirah visited South America, specifically Argentina, she was struck by the music and culture, and several songs on C'mon Miracle reflect her experience, most notably "The Dogs of B.A."

Reception

The album was met with positive reception, getting 4/5 from AllMusic, and 8.5/10 from Pitchfork Media.

Track listing

Personnel

Mirah - primary artist 
Phil Elvrum - producer

References

External links
MirahMusic.com

2004 albums
Mirah albums
K Records albums